An arête is a narrow ridge of rock which separates two valleys. It is typically formed when two glaciers erode parallel U-shaped valleys. Arêtes can also form when two glacial cirques erode headwards towards one another, although frequently this results in a saddle-shaped pass, called a col. The edge is then sharpened by freeze-thaw weathering, and the slope on either side of the arête steepened through mass wasting events and the erosion of exposed, unstable rock. The word arête is actually French for "edge" or "ridge"; similar features in the Alps are often described with the German equivalent term Grat.

Where three or more cirques meet, a pyramidal peak is created.

Cleaver

A cleaver is a type of arête that separates a unified flow of glacial ice from its uphill side into two glaciers flanking, and flowing parallel to, the ridge. Cleaver gets its name from the way it resembles a meat cleaver slicing meat into two parts.  A cleaver may be thought of as analogous to an island in a river.  A common situation has the two flanking glaciers melting to their respective ends before their courses can bring them back together; the exceedingly rare analogy is a situation of the two branches of a river drying up, before the downstream tip of the island, by evaporation or absorption into the ground.

The location of a cleaver is often an important factor in the choice among routes for glacier flow. For example, following a cleaver up or down a mountain may avoid travelling on or under an unstable glacial, snow, or rock area.  This is usually the case on those summer routes to the summit whose lower portions are on the south face of Mount Rainier: climbers traverse the ‘flats’ of Ingraham Glacier, but ascend Disappointment Cleaver and follow its ridgeline rather than ascending the headwall either of that glacier or (on the other side of the cleaver) of Emmons Glacier.

Examples

Notable examples of arêtes include:
 Beenkeragh Ridge, MacGillycuddy's Reeks, County Kerry, Ireland.
 The Carn Mor Dearg arête on to Ben Nevis, Scotland
 Clouds Rest, in the Sierra Nevada, California
 Crib Goch, in Snowdonia National Park, Wales
 The Garden Wall, in Glacier National Park, Montana (image to right)
 Half Dome, in Yosemite National Park, California
 Knife Edge, in Baxter State Park, Maine
 Koncheto , Pirin mountain, Bulgaria
 Mazeno Ridge, Gilgit-Baltistan, Pakistan
 The Minarets, in the Sierra Nevada, California
 The Sawtooth, in the Southern Rocky Mountains
 Strazhite (The guardians), Pirin mountain, Bulgaria
 Striding Edge in the English Lake District
 Trionite (The Saws), Rila mountain, Bulgaria

See also

References

Sources

External links

 Diagram
 Details on Mt Oberlin

Mountaineering
Glacial erosion landforms
Ridges
Oronyms